Petro Pakhnyuk or Petro Pakhniuk (born 26 November 1991 in Kyiv) is a Ukrainian (until 2014 and after 2017) and Azerbaijani (2014-2017) male artistic gymnast and member of the national team.

Career
He participated at the 2014 World Artistic Gymnastics Championships in Nanning, China, and qualified for the 2015 European Games and 2016 Summer Olympics. He is medalist of the European Games, Summer Universiades and European Championships.

In 2021, he represented Ukraine at the 2020 Summer Olympics in Tokyo, Japan.

References

External links 
 

1991 births
Living people
Ukrainian male artistic gymnasts
Azerbaijani male artistic gymnasts
Olympic gymnasts of Azerbaijan
Gymnasts at the 2016 Summer Olympics
European Games medalists in gymnastics
European Games bronze medalists for Azerbaijan
Gymnasts at the 2015 European Games
Universiade medalists in gymnastics
Gymnasts from Kyiv
Naturalized citizens of Azerbaijan
Universiade silver medalists for Ukraine
Gymnasts at the 2019 European Games
European Games bronze medalists for Ukraine
Medalists at the 2013 Summer Universiade
Medalists at the 2017 Summer Universiade
Gymnasts at the 2020 Summer Olympics
Olympic gymnasts of Ukraine
European champions in gymnastics